Alex M. Clark  (March 22, 1916 – February 14, 1991) was an American politician. He became the youngest mayor of Indianapolis in 1951. He served one term and later ran again in 1967, losing in the primary to eventual winner Richard Lugar. He was a World War II veteran, and a former POW. In 1956 he and a number of friends formed the Wyoming Antelope Hunters Club in Indianapolis, which is still an active social club today. Prior to being mayor, Clark was a deputy prosecutor and judge in Marion County, Indiana.

Clark died in Argentina in 1991 of a head injury while on a cruise, returning from Antarctica in pursuit of his goal to visit every continent.

References

External links

Mayors of Indianapolis
1916 births
1991 deaths
Indiana Republicans
20th-century American politicians
American military personnel of World War II
American prisoners of war in World War II
Deaths from head injury
DePauw University alumni
Indiana University alumni
Accidental deaths in Argentina